Our is a village of Wallonia in the municipality of Paliseul, district of Opont, located in the province of Luxembourg, Belgium.

The village is located on a promontory in the course of the river of the same name, Our. The village church is dedicated to Saint Lawrence. The village is a member of the association Les Plus Beaux Villages de Wallonie.

References

External links

Populated places in Luxembourg (Belgium)